In United States federal legislation, the Indian Education and Self-Assistance Act (Snyder Act) was passed in 1917 and sponsored by Rep. Homer P. Snyder (R) of New York. 

It empowered the Bureau of Indian Affairs, under the Secretary of the Interior, to appropriate money for the general improvement of the quality of life among Native Americans on reservations including adult literacy programs and health care facilities. Although a step in the right direction, the appropriations provided for the next several decades still proved inadequate to what was needed.

1917 in American law
United States federal legislation
Native American education
Native American law